Alfred L. Buchan (March 4, 1847 – February 17, 1905) was an American physician and politician serving in the Wisconsin State Assembly.

Born in what is now the town of Dover, Racine County, Wisconsin, Buchan received his Master of Arts degree from Monmouth College and then graduated from Rush Medical College and Bellevue Hospital and College. 

He then practiced medicine in Union Grove, Wisconsin and Racine, Wisconsin. In 1889, Buchan served in the Wisconsin State Assembly as a Republican. 

Buchan died of cancer in his home in Dover, Wisconsin.

Notes

1847 births
1905 deaths
People from Dover, Racine County, Wisconsin
Monmouth College alumni
Rush Medical College alumni
New York University Grossman School of Medicine alumni
Physicians from Wisconsin
Republican Party members of the Wisconsin State Assembly
People from Union Grove, Wisconsin
People from Racine, Wisconsin
19th-century American politicians